Seehas is a regional rail service that operates between Engen and Konstanz in the district of Konstanz, in Baden-Württemberg, Germany. It is managed and operated by SBB GmbH, the German subsidiary of Swiss Federal Railways. It began operation in 1994.

History 
These were operated by Mittelthurgaubahn, a Swiss company. EuroTHURBO itself merged into SBB GmbH in 2005. In 2006, SBB introduced Stadler FLIRT trains on the route and increased the service frequency to every 30 minutes.

Operation 

References

External links 
 
  

Passenger rail transport in Germany
Rail transport in Baden-Württemberg
Railway services introduced in 1994